Heather Bansley (born September 13, 1987, in London, Ontario) is a Canadian beach volleyball player, playing as a left-side defender. She has been named FIVB Best Defensive Player of the World Tour in 2015, 2016 and 2018.

University career
Bansley played CIS volleyball for the Toronto Varsity Blues for five seasons from 2005 to 2010 where she was a member of the 2009-10 OUA champions.

Pro career
Bansley and former partner Sarah Pavan were part of the Canadian team for the 2016 Summer Olympics.  After qualifying for the women's tournament, the pair competed in Pool E and won all 3 matches with a 2–0 set score. For the Round of 16 match, they were paired with the other Canadian team of Broder and Valjas, which they won in straight sets of (21–16, 21–11). They lost to Germany's Laura Ludwig and Kira Walkenhorst in straight sets of (14–21, 14–21) in the quarterfinals.

Bansley and her next partner Brandie Wilkerson first competed together at the Swatch World Tour finals in Toronto (Septe,ber 13–18, 2016), where they finished 9th. In 2018, they had a break-out year and closed the season ranked No. 1 on the FIVB world tour. 

Bansley and Wilkerson were named as part of the Canadian Olympic team for the 2020 Summer Olympics in Tokyo, one of the nation's two entries in the women's tournament along with the team of Bansley's former partner Pavan and Melissa Humana-Paredes.  Bansley and Wilkerson struggled during pool play, recording two losses and one win, but advanced into the knockout stages due to being one of the top two "Lucky Loser" teams. In the Round of 16 they were the sixteenth seed, but unexpectedly upset the third-seeded American team of Claes/Sponcil by winning two sets to one. In the quarter final they faced the Latvian team Kravčenoka/Graudiņa, and were eliminated after losing two sets to one.

Bansley announced her retirement in early 2022 and has joined the Canadian beach volleyball coaching staff, primarily working with their Next Gen program.

References

External links

 
 
 
 
 

Living people
Pan American Games competitors for Canada
1987 births
Beach volleyball defenders
Sportspeople from London, Ontario
Beach volleyball players at the 2011 Pan American Games
Canadian women's beach volleyball players
Beach volleyball players at the 2016 Summer Olympics
Olympic beach volleyball players of Canada
FIVB World Tour award winners
Toronto Varsity Blues volleyball players
Beach volleyball players at the 2020 Summer Olympics